Wagram Music is a French independent record company based in Paris, with offices in Berlin and Los Angeles.

Record company
Wagram's catalog covers various music genres such as French pop, Rock and Pop, world, electronic music, Reggae, Soul, Jazz and Blues.  Represented artists include Orelsan, - M -, Lamomali, Fatoumata Diawara, Dominique A, Suzanne, Philippe Katerine, Bertrand Belin, Inna de Yard, Ken Booth, Malik Djoudi, and Corneille.

Wagram Music has several subsidiary record labels:
 Cinq7, which includes the artists: Saez, Dominique A, Gush, Lilli Wood & The Prick, Melanie Pain, Rover, Oxmo Puccino, Tété, The Dø, etc.
 3ème Bureau, which includes the artists: Orelsan, Casseurs Flowters, Pony Pony Run Run, Naive New Beaters, Brigitte, and Ayọ.
 Chapter Two Records, which includes the artists: Winston Mcanuff, Fixi, Zoufris Maracas, Soviet Suprem, Clinton Fearon, and Inna de Yard.
 WLab, which includes the artists: Corneille, Ridsa, Caravan Palace.
 LaBréa.
 Belem.

Wagram is also affiliated with the record label Panenka (Therapy Taxi).

Wagram Music is a distributor, both digitally and physically, in France and internationally of its own labels and some prestigious labels like Beggars, Panenka, Radio Nova, Buddha Bar, etc.

Other activities
Wagram opened W Spectacle, its live company, in 2010. It manages concerts and tours for a roster of around 40 artists, including Rover, R.Wan, Winston McAnuff, Fatoumata Diawara, Bertrand Belin, and Ayọ.

Wagram Music is part of Wagram Stories, a global and independent artistic production company, involved in film and series production (Wagram Film), book publishing (Wagram Livres), live music, and communication (Wagram Agency).

See also
 List of record labels

References

External links
 Wagram Stories official website

French record labels
Jazz record labels